= El Matrag =

Algerian martial art

El Matrag (الماتراق)
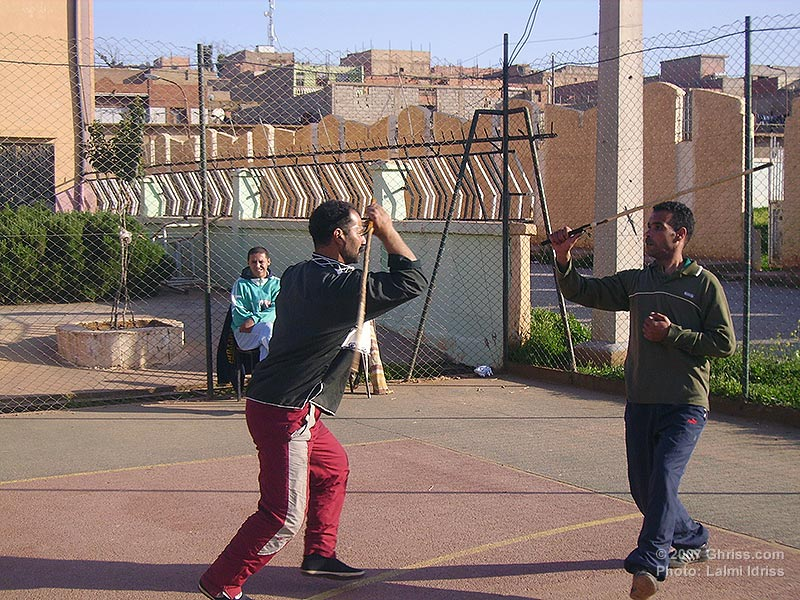
- Also known as: Matrag
- Creator: Unknown

El Matrag (Arabic: الماتراق), also spelt Al Matrag, is a form of stick fencing practised in western Algeria specifically the city of Oran.

== History ==
The stick of Al Matrag is believed to have been used to prepare the warriors of the Maghreb for the sword. There appears to be a number of correlations between the modern practice and the drills and movements featured in the Mamluk treatise: Kitāb al-makhzūn jāmiʻ al-funūn (The treasure that combines all arts).
